The 2022–23 NCAA Division I men's basketball season began on November 7, 2022. The regular season ended on March 12, 2023, with the 2023 NCAA Division I men's basketball tournament beginning with the First Four on March 14 and ending with the championship game at NRG Stadium in Houston on April 3.

Rule changes
The following rule changes were recommended by the NCAA Basketball Rules Committee to the Playing Rules Oversight Panel for the 2022−23 season: 
 Flopping will now result in a Class B technical foul.  Previously players called for flopping received a warning before a technical foul was assessed.
 Conferences (and the NIT) will continue to allow (on an experimental basis) use of live and prerecorded video streams at the team bench.
 Conferences (and the NIT) who choose to use five electronic-media timeouts in the second half of their games will be able to experiment with a new format for granting those timeouts. Currently, for a game using five electronic-media timeouts in the second half, the rulebook prescribes that four of those occur in the same manner as in the first half — that is, at the first dead ball at or after the 16-, 12-, 8-, and 4-minute marks, or up to 30 seconds prior to those marks in specific circumstances. The fifth electronic-media timeout occurs when first timeout requested by either team in the second half automatically becomes an electronic-media timeout. Competitions choosing to use this experimental rule will continue to have five electronic-media timeouts in the second half, but those will occur instead at or after the 17-, 14-, 11-, 8-, and 4-minute marks (or up to 30 seconds prior to those marks in specific circumstances), while the first team-requested timeout will no longer automatically become a media timeout.

Season headlines
 April 20, 2022
 Oscar Tshiebwe, the consensus national player of the year in 2021–22, announced he would return to Kentucky for his senior season. He became the first men's national player of the year to announce a return to college since 2008 player of the year Tyler Hansbrough at North Carolina.
 Jay Wright retired as head coach at Villanova after 21 seasons, ending a tenure that saw the Wildcats make four Final Four appearances, including national titles in 2016 and 2018, and included Wright's 2021 induction to the Basketball Hall of Fame.
 June 20 – Darius Lee, who led Houston Baptist (now Houston Christian) in scoring and rebounding last season, was killed in a mass shooting at a gathering in Harlem. Lee, a native of the New York City neighborhood, was the only fatality among the nine victims. On October 25, Lee was posthumously named Southland Conference preseason player of the year by unanimous vote of the conference's coaches.
 June 21 – Hartford, which started a transition from Division I to Division III in the 2021–22 school year, was announced as a new member of the D-III Commonwealth Coast Conference (CCC) effective in 2023–24. The CCC press release also confirmed previous reports that Hartford would leave the America East Conference after the 2021–22 season; the Hawks will play the 2022–23 season as a D-I independent.
 June 24 – Incarnate Word, which had announced a move from the Southland Conference (SLC) to the Western Athletic Conference (WAC), backed out of this move and elected to remain in the SLC.
 June 30 – The Big Ten Conference announced that UCLA and USC would join from the Pac-12 Conference in 2024, immediately after the current Pac-12 media contracts expire.
 July 11 – The SLC and Lamar jointly announced that Lamar, which had previously planned to leave the WAC in 2023 to return to the SLC, would expedite this move for the 2022–23 school year.
 July 15 – The WAC announced that starting with the 2023 editions, its men's and women's tournaments would be seeded via a set of advanced metrics that it calls the WAC Résumé Seeding System, developed by statistics guru Ken Pomeroy alongside WAC officials. Tournament entry will still be based on conference record.
 August 3 – The Colonial Athletic Association announced that Campbell would join from the Big South Conference in 2023.
 August 12
 The NCAA, which had previously announced that the NIT semifinals and final would not be held at the traditional New York City site for at least 2023 and 2024, announced the sites for those years. The 2023 final rounds will be at Orleans Arena in Las Vegas, and the 2024 final rounds will be at Hinkle Fieldhouse in Indianapolis. All games before the semifinals will continue to use campus sites.
 The Indiana University and Purdue University systems announced that Indiana University–Purdue University Indianapolis will be dissolved in 2024 and replaced by separate IU- and Purdue-affiliated institutions. The current athletic program, the IUPUI Jaguars, will transfer to the new IU Indianapolis.
 August 31 – The Division I Board of Directors adopted a series of changes to transfer rules.
 Transfer windows were adopted for all Division I sports. Student-athletes who wish to be immediately eligible at their next school must enter the NCAA transfer portal within the designated period(s) for their sport. For men's basketball, the window opens on the day after Selection Sunday and runs for 60 days.
 Student-athletes who experience head coaching changes, or those whose athletic aid is reduced, canceled, or not renewed, may transfer outside designated windows without penalty.
 Transferring student-athletes will be guaranteed their financial aid at their next school through graduation.
 September 21 – Houston Baptist University announced it had changed its name to Houston Christian University, effective immediately. The athletic nickname of Huskies was not affected.
 October 14 – Conference USA announced that ASUN Conference member Kennesaw State would join C-USA in 2024.
 October 24 – The AP released its preseason All-America team. Reigning national player of the year Oscar Tshiebwe and Gonzaga's Drew Timme were unanimous choices, joined by Armando Bacot of North Carolina, Marcus Sasser of Houston, and Trayce Jackson-Davis of Indiana.
 November 2 – ESPN reported that Gonzaga athletic director Chris Standiford and Big 12 Conference commissioner Brett Yormark had met the previous week in the Dallas area regarding a possible Gonzaga move to that conference as a full but non-football member. The report also indicated that Gonzaga had at least some level of talks with the Big East Conference and Pac-12 Conference in the preceding months.
 November 14 – Albany head coach Dwayne Killings, athletic director Mark Benson, and the university were sued by former Great Danes walk-on Luke Fizulich, who claimed that Killings had physically assaulted him before a game in the 2021–22 season, and had also interfered with his continued enrollment at Albany and hindered his chances of transferring to another school. The suit claimed that the university had decided to fire Killings after the incident, but changed the punishment to a five-game suspension under pressure from local business and civil rights leaders, and charged the university with showing preference to the African-American Killings due to his race.
 November 17 – During a meeting in San Francisco, the Regents of the University of California, the governing board of the University of California system, set a date of December 14 for a special meeting to make a final determination on UCLA's planned move to the Big Ten.
 December 14 – The UC Regents approved UCLA's move to the Big Ten. Additionally, conditions were made to mitigate athletes such as investing $12 million in beneficial services including nutritional support and charter flights to reduce travel time.  UCLA must also pay the University of California, Berkeley an additional $2 to $10 million due to the move affecting the latter's athletic program, with the precise total being made once the Pac-12 completes its upcoming media rights deal.
 January 15 – Alabama junior reserve forward Darius Miles was one of two men arrested and charged with capital murder in connection with a shooting early that morning near the Alabama campus in Tuscaloosa in which a woman was killed.
 February 9 – The Big 12 Conference announced that it had reached an agreement with Oklahoma and Texas that will allow the two schools to leave for the Southeastern Conference in 2024 instead of the originally announced 2025 schedule. Approval by the two schools' governing boards was seen as a formality.
 March 20 – St. Francis Brooklyn announced that it would terminate its athletic program after the spring 2023 semester.

Milestones and records
 During the season, the following players reached the 2,000 career point milestone – Virginia forward Jayden Gardner, Marshall guard Taevion Kinsey, Liberty guard Darius McGhee, Xavier guard Souley Boum, Oral Roberts guard Max Abmas, Coppin State guard Sam Sessoms, Texas guard Marcus Carr, Arizona State guard Desmond Cambridge, Tennessee State guard Jr. Clay, San Diego State guard Matt Bradley, Gonzaga forward Drew Timme, Memphis guard Kendric Davis, LSU forward KJ Williams, Purdue Fort Wayne guard Jarred Godfrey, Indiana forward Trayce Jackson-Davis, Wyoming swingman Hunter Maldonado, Texas Tech forward Kevin Obanor, Wake Forest guard Tyree Appleby, Fordham guard Darius Quisenberry, Penn State guard Jalen Pickett, DePaul guard Umoja Gibson, Texas forward Timmy Allen, NC State guard Jarkel Joiner, Loyola Marymount guard Cameron Shelton, and Furman guard Mike Bothwell.

 November 26 – California lost 67–59 to Clemson to start the season 0–7, becoming the first major-conference team in the last 40 years to start a season with that record. The Golden Bears fell to 0–12 before defeating UT Arlington 73–51 on December 21.
 November 28 – #18 Alabama defeated #1 North Carolina in 4 overtimes, 103–101. It was the second 4-overtime game in UNC history (Tulane, 1976) and the first time Alabama beat a top-ranked opponent since 2004 (Stanford).
 November 29 – Louisville became the second major-conference team in recent history to have started a season 0–7, losing 79–54 to Maryland. The Cardinals would slump to 0–9 before defeating Western Kentucky 94–83 on December 14. The Cardinals' start was the worst for any team in ACC history.
 November 30  – Yuri Collins of Saint Louis recorded 20 assists in a win over Tennessee State, setting a school record and tying for the fourth-most in a single game in Division I history.
 December 1 – Antoine Davis of Detroit Mercy became the all-time leading scorer in the Horizon League, surpassing Alfredrick Hughes' previous record in UDM's 75–66 win over Purdue Fort Wayne.
 December 10 – Antoine Davis became the 11th NCAA Division I men's player with 3,000 career points, scoring 36 in an 82–80 loss to Charlotte to bring his total to 3,001.
 December 21 – Eastern Illinois defeated Iowa 92–83 on the road as a 31.5-point underdog according to Las Vegas sports books. This was the largest point-spread upset in D-I men's basketball in at least the previous 30 years.
 January 7 – Virginia defeats Syracuse, giving head coach Tony Bennett his 327th win at the school, breaking a school record previously held by Terry Holland. In the same game, Virginia forward Jayden Gardner grabbed his 1,000th rebound, putting him on a short list of Division I players with both 2,000 points and 1,000 rebounds.
 January 14
 Antoine Davis hit 11 three-pointers in UDM's 87–75 win over Robert Morris to give him 513 career threes, surpassing the previous D-I record of 509 by Wofford's Fletcher Magee.
 Eleven teams ranked in the AP poll lost, tying the record for most such losses on a single day previously set on January 29, 2011.
 February 2 – With a 68-59 win over San Francisco, Saint Mary's Gaels head coach Randy Bennett earned his 500th win as head coach, all of them with the Gaels. He became the 25th coach to notch 500 wins at a sole school.
 February 4 – McGhee became Liberty's career scoring leader in the Flames' 69–64 loss to Lipscomb. The previous record was held by Karl Hess, who played for the Flames from 1976–1980 when the school was an NAIA member.
 February 11 – Northwestern defeated Purdue 64–58, earning its first-ever victory over an AP Poll #1 ranked team.
 February 12 – Godfrey became Purdue Fort Wayne's career scoring leader in the Mastodons' 71–64 loss to Robert Morris, surpassing John Konchar, whose college career from 2015–2019 started at PFW's athletic predecessor of IPFW.
 February 16 – Kendric Davis became the American Athletic Conference's all-time men's scoring leader in Memphis' 64–63 win over UCF. Davis, who began his college career at Big 12 member TCU before playing three seasons at American member SMU and then moving to Memphis for his final season of eligibility, broke the record of Temple's Quinton Rose.
 February 22 – McGhee became the men's career scoring leader for the ASUN Conference in Liberty's 85–77 win over Queens, surpassing Centenary's Willie Jackson. McGhee also became the fourth Division I men's player, and fifth D-I player overall, with 500 career threes.
 February 25 – Florida State completed the largest come-from-behind win in ACC history (25 points), defeating #13 Miami 85–84 on a buzzer-beating three-pointer by FSU's Matthew Cleveland.
 March 7 – Gonzaga's Drew Timme passed Frank Burgess (2,196 points) as Gonzaga's all-time leading scorer during the Bulldogs' 77–51 win over Saint Mary's during the West Coast Conference tournament championship. Burgess's record had stood since 1961.

Conference membership changes
Twenty-six schools joined new conferences or became independents, including five schools from Division II which started transitions to Division I this season and one in the process of transition from Division I to Division III.

As noted previously, Incarnate Word had announced plans to move from the Southland Conference to the Western Athletic Conference, but backed out of that move and remained in the Southland. Lamar, which initially planned to make the opposite move in 2023, pushed this move forward to 2022.

The 2022−23 season is the last for at least 15 Division I schools in their current conferences, is Hartford's only season as a D-I independent, and the last season of athletics for St. Francis Brooklyn.

Arenas

New arenas
 Alabama A&M opened the new Alabama A&M Events Center on November 18, losing its first game in the new facility 80–76 to Louisiana Tech on November 23.
 Fairfield's former home of Alumni Hall was replaced on-site by the  new Leo D. Mahoney Arena. The Stags' first game in the new facility was a 67–55 win over Saint Peter's on December 3.
Georgia State left GSU Sports Arena for the new Georgia State Convocation Center. The opening ceremony for the new arena was on September 15, with the first event taking place the following day. The Panthers' first official game was a 76–59 win over NAIA member Coastal Georgia on November 7.
Texas moved from the Frank Erwin Center to the Moody Center. The Longhorns' first official game was a 72–57 win over UTEP on November 7.

Arenas of new D-I teams
All five new D-I members in 2022–23 play on their respective campuses.
 Lindenwood plays at Robert F. Hyland Performance Arena.
 Queens plays at Curry Arena.
 Southern Indiana plays at Screaming Eagles Arena.
 Stonehill plays at Merkert Gymnasium.
 Texas A&M–Commerce plays at the Texas A&M–Commerce Field House.

Arenas closing
The following D-I programs plan to open new arenas for the 2023−24 season. or will move to a different pre-existing venue. All will move within their current campuses otherwise indicated.
 Austin Peay will leave the on-campus Winfield Dunn Center for the new F&M Bank Arena in downtown Clarksville, Tennessee after 49 seasons. The new arena was originally planned to open for the 2022–23 season, but was delayed to 2023–24.
Baylor will leave the Ferrell Center for the new Foster Pavilion; the venue is scheduled to open in the fall of 2023 or early 2024.
Georgia Southern will leave the Hanner Fieldhouse for the new Jack and Ruth Ann Hill Convocation Center. The venue was scheduled to open in the early fall of 2023, but was delayed until 2024-25 season.
Longwood will leave Willett Hall for the new Joan Perry Brock Center; the venue is scheduled to open in Summer 2023.
St. Francis Brooklyn in 2022 began closing its Remsen Street campus, including Generoso Pope Athletic Complex, as part of the college's move to a new campus on Livingston Street. Home games will at least temporarily be played about 2 miles (3 km) away at Pratt Institute, as the Livingston Street campus has no basketball venue. The final men's basketball game played at Pope Athletic Complex was a 61–58 win over Saint Peter's on November 19.
 Vermont was originally slated to open the new Tarrant Event Center, the replacement for Patrick Gym, in 2021. However, the new arena has since been placed on indefinite hold. Construction was initially halted by COVID-19. With the Tarrant Center being part of a much larger upgrade of UVM's athletic and recreation facilities, UVM chose to prioritize a new student recreation center. Construction of the Tarrant Center is now being hampered by increased borrowing costs.

Seasonal outlook

The Top 25 from the AP and USA Today Coaching Polls

Pre-season polls

Top 10 matchups
Rankings reflect the AP poll Top  25.

Regular season
Nov. 15
 No. 6 Kansas defeated No. 7 Duke, 69–64 (Champions Classic - Gainbridge Fieldhouse, Indianapolis, IN)
Nov. 20
 No. 2 Gonzaga defeated No. 4 Kentucky, 88–72 (Spokane Arena, Spokane, WA)
 No. 5 Baylor defeated No. 8 UCLA, 80–75 (Continental Tire Main Event - T-Mobile Arena, Paradise, NV)
Nov. 22
No. 10 Creighton defeated No. 9 Arkansas, 90–87 (Maui Invitational - Lahaina Civic Center, Lahaina, HI)
Dec. 1
No. 2 Texas defeated No. 7 Creighton, 72–67 (Big East–Big 12 Battle - Moody Center, Austin, TX)
Dec. 10
No. 8 Alabama defeated No. 1 Houston, 71–65 (Fertitta Center, Houston, TX)
Dec. 17
No. 5 Houston defeated No. 2 Virginia, 69–61 (John Paul Jones Arena, Charlottesville, VA)
No. 9 Arizona defeated No. 6 Tennessee, 75–70 (McKale Center, Tucson, AZ)
Jan. 28
No. 4 Tennessee defeated No. 10 Texas, 82–71 (Big 12/SEC Challenge - Thompson–Boling Arena, Knoxville, TN)
Jan. 31
No. 8 Kansas defeated No. 7 Kansas State, 90–78 (Allen Fieldhouse, Lawrence, KS)
Feb. 4
No. 10 Texas defeated No. 7 Kansas State, 69–66 (Bramlage Coliseum, Manhattan, KS)
Feb. 6
No. 9 Kansas defeated No. 5 Texas, 88–80 (Allen Fieldhouse, Lawrence, KS)
Feb. 15
No. 10 Tennessee defeated No. 1 Alabama, 68–59 (Thompson-Boling Arena, Knoxville, TN)
Feb. 18
No. 5 Kansas defeated No. 9 Baylor, 87–71 (Allen Fieldhouse, Lawrence, KS)
Feb. 25
No. 9 Baylor defeated No. 8 Texas, 81–72 (Ferrell Center, Waco, TX)
Mar. 4
No. 9 Texas defeated No. 3 Kansas, 75–59 (Moody Center, Austin, TX)
No. 4 UCLA defeated No. 8 Arizona, 82–73 (Pauley Pavilion, Los Angeles, CA)
Mar. 11
No. 7 Texas defeated No. 3 Kansas, 76–56 (2023 Big 12 men's basketball tournament - T-Mobile Center, Kansas City, MO)
No. 8 Arizona defeated No. 2 UCLA, 61–59 (2023 Pac-12 Conference men's basketball tournament - T-Mobile Center, Paradise, NV)

Postseason

Regular season

Early season tournaments

Upsets 

An upset is a victory by an underdog team. In the context of NCAA Division I men's basketball, this generally constitutes an unranked team defeating a team currently  ranked in the top 25. This list will highlight those upsets of ranked teams by unranked teams as well as upsets of No. 1 teams. Rankings are from the AP poll. Bold type indicates winning teams in "true road games"—i.e., those played on an opponent's home court (including secondary homes). Italics type indicates winning teams in an early season tournament (or event). Early season tournaments are tournaments played in the early season. Events are the tournaments with the same teams in it every year (even rivalry games).

In addition to the above listed upsets in which an unranked team defeated a ranked team, there have been eight non-Division I teams to defeat a Division I team so far this season. Bold type indicates winning teams in "true road games"—i.e., those played on an opponents home court (including secondary homes).

Conference winners and tournaments 

Each of the 32 Division I athletic conferences will end its regular season with a single-elimination tournament. The team with the best regular-season record in each conference receives the number one seed in each tournament, with tiebreakers used as needed in the case of ties for the top seeding. Unless otherwise noted, the winners of these tournaments will receive automatic invitations to the 2023 NCAA Division I men's basketball tournament.

Conference standings

Award winners

2023 consensus All-Americans

Major player of the year awards
Wooden Award:
Naismith Award: 
Associated Press Player of the Year: 
NABC Player of the Year: 
Oscar Robertson Trophy (USBWA): 
Sporting News Player of the Year: Zach Edey, Purdue

Major freshman of the year awards
Wayman Tisdale Award (USBWA): 
 NABC Freshman of the Year:

Major coach of the year awards
Associated Press Coach of the Year: 
Henry Iba Award (USBWA): 
NABC Coach of the Year: 
Naismith College Coach of the Year: 
 Sporting News Coach of the Year: Rodney Terry, Texas

Other major awards

 Naismith Starting Five:
 Bob Cousy Award (best point guard): 
 Jerry West Award (best shooting guard): 
 Julius Erving Award (best small forward): 
 Karl Malone Award (best power forward): 
 Kareem Abdul-Jabbar Award (best center): 
 Pete Newell Big Man Award (best big man): 
 NABC Defensive Player of the Year: 
 Naismith Defensive Player of the Year: 
Lute Olson Award: 
Robert V. Geasey Trophy (top player in Philadelphia Big 5): 
Haggerty Award (top player in NYC metro area): 
Ben Jobe Award (top minority coach): 
Hugh Durham Award (top mid-major coach): 
Jim Phelan Award (top head coach): 
Lefty Driesell Award (top defensive player): 
Lou Henson Award (top mid-major player): 
Skip Prosser Man of the Year Award (coach with moral character): 
Academic All-American of the Year (top scholar-athlete): Ben Vander Plas, Virginia
 Elite 90 Award (top GPA among upperclass players at Final Four): 
 Perry Wallace Most Courageous Award: Terrence Hargrove, Saint Louis & Connor Odom, Utah State

Coaching changes
Many teams will change coaches during the season and after it ends. Two teams changed coaches shortly before their first regular-season games.

See also
2022–23 NCAA Division I women's basketball season

References